Roger Albinyana i Saigí is a Catalan politician. He was President of the European Liberal Youth (LYMEC) from 2004–2008 and active within the ELDR Party.

In the spring of 2004, he assumed the presidency of LYMEC- European Liberal Youth and was re-elected to the post in April 2006 for a mandate of two years.

In 2007 Roger Albinyana, together with Alfons López Tena and Hèctor López Bofill founded the Cercle d'Estudis Sobiranistes (CES), a Catalan think-tank focused in legal issues regarding sovereignty and ways towards the independence of Catalonia, of which he holds the Director's position.

References

Living people
Year of birth missing (living people)
Politicians from Catalonia